Suzan Emine Kaube (born Emine Ese; 1942 in Pendik, Turkey) is a Turkish-German writer, painter and pedagogue.

As a pedagogue, her works has dealt with cultural integration. She has made several exhibitions in Germany and Turkey.

Works
Tanz im Westwind oder du gibst mir erst Almosen, dann die Hölle (1999) 
 Uyuyan Göl
 Tanz im Westwind
 Auf türkisgrünen Flügeln
 Heimlich und kühl
 Turkuvaz Kanatlılar (2011)

External links
 
  Künstlerhomepage

Living people
People from Pendik

Turkish writers
Turkish emigrants to Germany
Erenköy Girls High School alumni
German women writers
Turkish women writers
1942 births